General William Jervois KH (1782 – 5 November 1862) was Commander and Lieutenant Governor of Hong Kong. Jervois Street in Hong Kong was named after him.

Military career
Jervois served in the Peninsular War and, having been promoted to Lieutenant General in 1846, went on to be Commander and Lieutenant Governor of Hong Kong in 1851.

He was also colonel of the 76th Regiment of Foot. He was promoted general on 3 August 1860.

Family
He married Elizabeth Maitland and had at least one son (William Francis Drummond Jervois).

References

|-

1782 births
1862 deaths
British Army generals
British Army personnel of the Napoleonic Wars